Michele Franco (born 20 February 1985) is an Italian former professional footballer who is the director of football of  club Monza.

Playing career
Franco began his career Bari and, from 2005 to 2008, was sent on loan in Lega Pro to Melfi, Cremonese and Manfredonia. From 2008 to 2011, he played for Como in Lega Pro, before moving in August 2011 to Serie B to Padova. In January 2013, Franco signed a two-year contract with Varese.

On 11 January 2019, he signed with Trapani. On 5 August 2019, he joined Serie C club Monza on a one-year contract. On 2 September 2020, Franco joined newly-promoted Serie C side Pro Sesto.

Managerial career 
In July 2022, Franco was appointed club manager of newly-promoted Serie A side Monza. He became director of football on 30 November 2022.

Honours 
Monza
 Serie C Group A: 2019–20

References

External links
 Profile at Legaserieb.it 
 Profile at Gazzetta.it 
 Profile at Football.it 
 

1985 births
Living people
People from Altamura
Italian footballers
Association football fullbacks
S.S.C. Bari players
Calcio Padova players
S.S.D. Varese Calcio players
A.C. Perugia Calcio players
U.S. Salernitana 1919 players
Trapani Calcio players
A.C. Monza players
S.S.D. Pro Sesto players
Serie B players
Serie C players
Footballers from Apulia
Sportspeople from the Metropolitan City of Bari